Charles Douglas may refer to:
 Charles Douglas, 3rd Duke of Queensberry (1698–1778), Scottish nobleman
 Charles Douglas, 6th Marquess of Queensberry (1777–1837), Scottish peer
 Charles Douglas, 5th Lord Mordington 18th-century Scottish peer
 Charles Douglas, 3rd Baron Douglas (1775–1848), English amateur cricketer
 Charles Douglas (mayor) (1852–1917), mayor of Vancouver and politician in Manitoba
 Sir Charles Douglas, 1st Baronet (1727–1789), Royal Navy officer
 Charles W. H. Douglas (1850–1914), former Chief of the Imperial General Staff of the British Army
 Charles Douglas III (born 1942), former congressman from New Hampshire
 Charles Douglas (musician), pseudonym of novelist and musician, Alex McAulay
 Charles Eurwicke Douglas (1806–1887), Member of Parliament for Warwick, 1837–1852, and Banbury, 1859–1865
 Charles Mackinnon Douglas (1865–1924), Member of Parliament for North West Lanarkshire, 1899–1906
 Charlie Douglas (1840–1916), New Zealand explorer and surveyor
 Charles F. Douglas (1833–1904), American architect from Maine

See also
 Charles Douglass (1910–2003), American inventor
 Charles Henry Douglass (1870–1940), American businessman in Georgia
 Charles Remond Douglass, son of Frederick Douglass
 Charles Douglas-Home (disambiguation)